Kashuk or Keshuk or Kashook or Kishuk may refer to:
 Kashuk-e Olya
 Kashuk-e Sofla